"On the Metro" is a song by British all-female pop group Girls Aloud, recorded and taken from their second greatest hits compilation Ten (2012). The song was written by Girls Aloud member Nicola Roberts, along with its producers Jason Pebworth, George Astasio, Shave and Dan Stein, otherwise known by The Invisible Men and DJ Fresh.

The song is a dance-pop song, which is influenced by progressive house music and J-pop. Many contemporary music critics acclaimed the song, with many feeling that the production was still up to date and felt that it was one of the best electropop-recorded songs ever. Many critics also deemed it one of the best songs on the album, with many fans believing it would have been more fitting as the album's second/final single rather than "Beautiful 'Cause You Love Me".

Background and composition
The group's second compilation album, Ten, was the first record to be released by the group since their hiatus in 2008. Before then, the group signed a 3-album deal with Fascination Records in February 2009. The group were required to record new material in 2010, but this failed to go forth.

The song was written by Girls Aloud member Nicola Roberts, along with Jason Pebworth, George Astasio, Shave and Dan Stein, while production was handled by The Invisible Men and DJ Fresh. Along with the song "Beautiful 'Cause You Love Me", with the inclusion of both tracks makes Ten the first album since their debut, Sound of the Underground, not to be produced exclusively by Xenomania. After its release with Ten, fellow member Kimberley Walsh tweeted her praise for Roberts for writing the song, stating "So happy you all like #OnTheMetro !!! Our very own @nicolaroberts is a very talented songwriter #proud". Musically wise, the song was described as a "J-Pop with trance synths and sub-bass in their typically OTT manner [...]" Andy Kellman from Allmusic felt the musical composition was "sleek and speedy".

Critical reception
"On the Metro" received critical acclaim from contemporary music critics. With the headline describing the song as "Unparalleled Amazingness", Bradley Stern from MuuMuse gave it a positive remark describing the song as "better electro-pop perfection" and said "“On The Metro” is a 100% flaw-free dance-pop tune. It plays like a cross between the ferocity of “Memory of You” and Mini Viva's “Left My Heart In Tokyo.” A reviewer from The Reflective Inklings awarded the song five-out-of-five stars, stating "On The Metro [...] will instantly wow the listener with the song’s smart electropop gloss doing what it is supposed to do. The chorus packs a whole lot of conviction and is one of the song’s strongest suits." Ian Wade from BBC Music described the song as an "raving-through-the-tears amazingness."

Robert Corpsey of Digital Spy believed that along with "Every Now and Then", the song would prove "the prospect of a new Girls Aloud album in 2013 would be a very exciting one indeed." He also highlighted the song as an album standout. A reviewer from So So Gay believed that "On the Metro" and "Every Now and Then"
are far more standard Girls Aloud fare.

Live performances
In 2013, the song was performed by Girls Aloud on the Ten: The Hits Tour.

Format and track listing
Digital download
 "On the Metro" – 3:15

References

2012 songs
Girls Aloud songs
Songs written by Jason Pebworth
Songs written by Jon Shave
Songs written by George Astasio
Songs written by Nicola Roberts
Song recordings produced by the Invisible Men
Songs about transport